is a private university in Toyama, Toyama, Japan. Toyama College is attached to the Kureha Campus. The predecessor of the school was founded in 1963, and it was chartered as a university in 1990.

External links
 Official website 

Educational institutions established in 1963
Private universities and colleges in Japan
Universities and colleges in Toyama Prefecture
1963 establishments in Japan
Toyama (city)